Joe Russell (17 March 1898 – 10 April 1976) was a former Australian rules footballer who played with Carlton in the Victorian Football League (VFL).

Notes

External links 

Joe Russell's profile at Blueseum

1898 births
Carlton Football Club players
North Melbourne Football Club (VFA) players
Australian rules footballers from Victoria (Australia)
1976 deaths